The 1987 Pittsburgh Steelers season was the franchise's 55th season as a professional sports franchise and as a member of the National Football League.  The team improved from a 6-10 record from 1986 and finishing 8-7 record and fail to reach the playoffs for a third straight season.  Noll was renowned as a stoic character, but in complete contrast was his reaction to Jerry Glanville, the head coach of the Oilers.  After the Steelers second meeting, Noll in the postgame handshake grabbed Glanville and told him he'd better watch out or he'd get jumped on.  This was in reaction to Glanville's earlier comments on how the Oilers field was the 'house of pain' and his prediction that his players would intentionally hurt the Steelers.

Offseason

NFL draft

Personnel

Staff

NFL replacement players
After the league decided to use replacement players during the NFLPA strike, the following team was assembled:

Roster

Preseason

Schedule

Regular season

Schedule

Game summaries

Week 1 (Sunday September 13, 1987): vs. San Francisco 49ers 

at Three Rivers Stadium, Pittsburgh, Pennsylvania

 Game time: 1:00 PM EDT
 Game weather: 76 °F (Drizzle)
 Game attendance: 55,735
 Referee: Gordon McCarter
 TV announcers: (CBS) Jim Lampley (play by play), Ken Stabler (color commentator)
 Pittsburgh – Hall 50 fumble return (Anderson kick)
 San Francisco – FG Wersching 43
 Pittsburgh – Gothard 2 pass from Malone (Anderson kick)
 Pittsburgh – FG Anderson 50
 Pittsburgh – FG Anderson 41
 San Francisco – Frank 1 pass from Montana (Wersching kick)
 Pittsburgh – FG Anderson 44
 Pittsburgh – Abercrombie 28 run (Anderson kick)
 San Francisco – Rice 3 pass from Montana (Wersching kick)

Week 2 (Sunday September 20, 1987): at Cleveland Browns  

at Cleveland Municipal Stadium, Cleveland, Ohio

 Game time: 1:00 PM EDT
 Game weather: 
 Game attendance: 79,543
 Referee: Gene Barth
 TV announcers: (NBC) Marv Albert (play by play), Joe Namath (color commentator)
 Cleveland – FG Jaeger 29
 Cleveland – Mack 1 run (Jaeger kick)
 Pittsburgh – FG Anderson 27
 PIttsburgh – Shell 19 fumble return (Anderson kick)
 Cleveland – McNeil 11 pass from Kosar (Jaeger kick)
 Cleveland – FG Jaeger 23
 Cleveland – Matthews 26 interception return (Jaeger kick)
 Cleveland – Weathers 37 pass from Kosar (Jaeger kick)

Week 3 (Sunday September 27, 1987): vs. New York Jets 
Cancelled due to player's strike.

Week 4 (Sunday October 4, 1987): at Atlanta Falcons  

at Atlanta–Fulton County Stadium, Atlanta, Georgia

 Game time: 1:00 PM EDT
 Game weather: 
 Game attendance: 16,667
 Referee: Red Cashion
 TV announcers: (NBC) Mel Proctor (play by play), Reggie Rucker (color commentator)

This game was played with replacement players.

 Atlanta – FG Davis 27
 Pittsburgh – Jackson 1 run (Trout kick)
 Pittsburgh – Hairston 5 pass from Bono (Trout kick)
 Atlanta – Safety, Bono penalized for intentional grounding in end zone
 Pittsburgh – Bono 1 run (Trout kick)
 Pittsburgh – Clinkscales 11 pass from Collier (Trout kick)
 Atlanta – Barney 19 pass from Van Raaphorst (Davis kick)

Week 5 (Sunday October 11, 1987): at Los Angeles Rams  

at Anaheim Stadium, Anaheim, California

 Game time: 4:00 PM EDT
 Game weather: 
 Game attendance: 20,219
 Referee: Bob Frederic
 TV announcers: (NBC) Fred Roggin (play by play), Dave Lapham (color commentator)

This game was played with replacement players.

 Los Angeles Rams – Jackson recovered blocked punt in end zone (Lansford kick)
 Pittsburgh – Alston 22 pass from Bono (Trout kick)
 Pittsburgh – Carter 10 pass from Bono (Trout kick)
 Los Angeles Rams – White 2 run (Lansford kick)
 Los Angeles Rams – McDonald 1 pass from Dils (Lansford kick)
 Los Angeles Rams – Moore 11 pass from Dils (Lansford kick)
 Los Angeles Rams – FG Lansford 29
 Pittsburgh – Alston 42 pass from Collier (Trout kick)

Week 6 (Sunday October 18, 1987): vs. Indianapolis Colts  

at Three Rivers Stadium, Pittsburgh, Pennsylvania

 Game time: 1:00 PM EDT
 Game weather: 53 °F (Scattered Clouds)
 Game attendance: 34,627
 Referee: Tom Dooley
 TV announcers: (NBC) Tom Hammond (play by play), Sam Rutigliano (color commentator)

This game was played with replacement players.

 Pittsburgh – Stallworth 3 pass from Bono (Trout kick)
 Indianapolis – Murray 20 pass from Kiel (Jordan kick)
 Pittsburgh – Hoge 20 pass from Bono (Trout kick)
 Pittsburgh – Sanders 10 run (Trout kick)

Week 7 (Sunday October 25, 1987): vs. Cincinnati Bengals  

at Three Rivers Stadium, Pittsburgh, Pennsylvania

 Game time: 1:00 PM EST
 Game weather: 49 °F (Mostly Cloudy)
 Game attendance: 53,692
 Referee: Fred Wyant
 TV announcers: (NBC) Don Criqui (play by play), Bob Trumpy (color commentator)
 Cincinnati – Kinnebrew 2 run (Breech kick)
 Pittsburgh – FG Anderson 45
 Cincinnati – Martin 41 pass from Esiason (Breech kick)
 Pittsburgh – Hall 25 run with lateral after Hinkle interception (Anderson kick)
 Cincinnati – Jennings 9 pass from Esiason (kick failed)
 Pittsburgh – FG Anderson 21
 Pittsburgh – Stallworth 12 pass from Malone (Anderson kick)
 Pittsburgh – FG Anderson 20

Week 8 (Sunday November 1, 1987): at Miami Dolphins  

at Joe Robbie Stadium, Miami, Florida

 Game time: 1:00 PM EST
 Game weather: 
 Game attendance: 52,578
 Referee: Bob McElwee
 TV announcers: (NBC) Sam Nover (play by play), Michael Jackson (color commentator)
 Pittsburgh – Lockett 10 pass from Malone (Anderson kick)
 Pittsburgh – Shell 50 interception return (Anderson kick)
 Miami – Hardy 2 pass from Marino (Reveiz kick)
 Pittsburgh – Pollard 1 run (Anderson kick)
 Miami – Clayton 41 pass from Marino (Reveiz kick)
 Pittsburgh – FG Anderson 43
 Miami – Duper 50 pass from Marino (Reveiz kick)
 Miami – Clayton 33 pass from Marino (Reveiz kick)
 Miami – Stradford 5 run (Reveiz kick)

Week 9 (Sunday November 8, 1987): at Kansas City Chiefs  

at Arrowhead Stadium, Kansas City, Missouri

 Game time: 1:00 PM EST
 Game weather: 
 Game attendance: 45,249
 Referee: Jim Tunney
 TV announcers: (NBC) Tom Hammond (play by play), Michael Jackson (color commentator)
 Kansas City – Maas 6 fumble return (Lowery kick)
 Pittsburgh – Carter 4 pass from Malone (Anderson kick)
 Kansas City – FG Lowery 41
 Pittsburgh – Carter 26 pass from Malone (Anderson kick)
 Kansas City – FG Lowery 27
 Kansas City – FG Lowery 38
 Pittsburgh – FG Anderson 44

Week 10 (Sunday November 15, 1987): vs. Houston Oilers  

at Three Rivers Stadium, Pittsburgh, Pennsylvania

 Game time: 1:00 PM EST
 Game weather: 63 °F (Partly Cloudy)
 Game attendance: 56,177
 Referee: Jerry Seeman
 TV announcers: (NBC) Marv Albert (play by play), Joe Namath (color commentator)
 Pittsburgh – FG Anderson 22
 Houston – FG Zendejas 34
 Houston – Duncan 14 pass from Moon (Zendejas kick)
 Houston – D. Hill 42 pass from Moon (Zendejas kick)
 Houston – FG Zendejas 20
 Houston – FG Zendejas 40

Week 11 (Sunday November 22, 1987): at Cincinnati Bengals  

at Riverfront Stadium, Cincinnati, Ohio

 Game time: 1:00 PM EST
 Game weather: 
 Game attendance: 59,910
 Referee: Fred Silva
 TV announcers: (NBC) Mel Proctor (play by play), Sam Rutigliano (color commentator)
 Pittsburgh – FG Anderson 43
 Cincinnati – FG Breech 35
 Pittsburgh – FG Anderson 52
 Pittsburgh – Woodson 45 interception return (Anderson kick)
 Cincinnati – FG Breech 38
 Cincinnati – FG Breech 41
 Pittsburgh – Thompson 14 pass from Malone (Anderson kick)
 Pittsburgh – FG Anderson 46
 CIncinnati – Kinnebrew 2 run (Breech kick)
 Pittsburgh – Malone 42 run (Anderson kick)

Week 12 (Sunday November 29, 1987): vs. New Orleans Saints  

at Three Rivers Stadium, Pittsburgh, Pennsylvania

 Game time: 1:00 PM EST
 Game weather: 48 °F (Overcast)
 Game attendance: 47,896
 Referee: Fred Wyant
 TV announcers: (CBS) Tim Brant (play by play), Hank Stram (color commentator)
 New Orleans – FG Andersen 25
 Pittsburgh – Woodruff 33 interception return (Anderson kick)
 Pittsburgh – Abercrombie 5 run (Anderson kick)
 New Orleans – Mayes 5 run (Andersen kick)
 New Orleans – Martin 19 pass from Hebert (Andersen kick)
 New Orleans – FG Andersen 32
 Pittsburgh – Safety, Hansen ran out of end zone

Week 13 (Sunday December 6, 1987): vs. Seattle Seahawks  

at Three Rivers Stadium, Pittsburgh, Pennsylvania

 Game time: 1:00 PM EST
 Game weather: 32 °F (Overcast)
 Game attendance: 48,881
 Referee: Gordon McCarter
 TV announcers: (NBC) Tom Hammond (play by play), Michael Jackson (color commentator)
 Pittsburgh – FG Anderson 37
 Seattle – FG Johnson 33
 Seattle – Largent 12 pass from Krieg (pass failed)
 Pittsburgh – FG Anderson 24
 Pittsburgh – Pollard 11 run (Anderson kick)

Week 14 (Sunday December 13, 1987): at San Diego Chargers  

at Jack Murphy Stadium, San Diego, California

 Game time: 4:00 PM EST
 Game weather: 
 Game attendance: 51,605
 Referee: Jim Tunney
 TV announcers: (NBC) Don Criqui (play by play), Bob Trumpy (color commentator)
 San Diego – Brandon recovered blocked punt in end zone (Abbott kick)
 San Diego – Safety, Ehin tackled Malone in end zone
 Pittsburgh – Pollard 8 run (Anderson kick)
 Pittsburgh – Malone 7 run (Anderson kick)
 Pittsburgh – FG Anderson 43
 Pittsburgh – FG Anderson 33
 San Diego – James 15 pass from Fouts (Abbott kick)

Week 15 (Sunday December 20, 1987): at Houston Oilers  

at Astrodome, Houston, Texas

 Game time: 1:00 PM EST
 Game weather: Dome
 Game attendance: 36,683
 Referee: Tom Dooley
 TV announcers: (NBC) Tom Hammond (play by play), Sam Rutigliano (color commentator)
 Pittsburgh – FG Anderson 25
 Pittsburgh – FG Anderson 35
 Houston – Hill 52 pass from Moon (Zendejas kick)
 Houston – FG Zendejas 34
 Pittsburgh – Malone 1 run (Anderson kick)
 Houston – Pinkett 5 run (Zendejas kick)
 Pittsburgh – FG Anderson 20
 Houston – Hill 30 pass from Moon (Zendejas kick)

Week 16 (Saturday December 26, 1987): vs. Cleveland Browns  

at Three Rivers Stadium, Pittsburgh, Pennsylvania

 Game time: 12:30 PM EST
 Game weather: 35 °F (Overcast)
 Game attendance: 56,394
 Referee: Dick Hantak
 TV announcers: (NBC) Don Criqui (play by play), Bob Trumpy (color commentator)
 Cleveland – FG Bahr 31
 Cleveland – Tennell 2 pass from Kosar (kick failed)
 Pittsburgh – FG Anderson 39
 Cleveland – FG Bahr 30
 Pittsburgh – FG Anderson 27
 Cleveland – Byner 2 run (Bahr kick)
 Pittsburgh – Gowdy 45 interception return (Anderson kick)

Standings

References

External links
 1987 Pittsburgh Steelers season at Profootballreference.com 
 1987 Pittsburgh Steelers season statistics at jt-sw.com

Pittsburgh Steelers seasons
Pittsburgh Steelers
Pitts